Perfecto Presents Ibiza is a DJ mix album by Paul Oakenfold.

Track listing

Disc 1
Nat Monday - "Waiting" (John Creamer Remix)
Jan Johnston - "Superstar" (Bill Hamel Mix)
The Realm - "This Is Not a Breakdown"
Flash - "Megatron"
Elektronauts - "Bumper" (Plump DJ's Mix)
Radiohead - "Idioteque"
Accadia - "Into the Dawn" (Ashtrax Remix)
Timo Maas - "Maas Attacks"
Arena - "Transit"
The Prodigy - "Narayan"

Disc 2
World Clique - "Different Signs"
Depeche Mode- - "I Feel Loved" (Danny Tenaglia's Labour of Love Mix)
Nilo - "A Summer Song (Be My Friend)" (Davoli's Propane Mix)
AB/DC - "The Feeling"
U2 - "Beautiful Day" (The Perfecto Mix)
Max Graham - "Sepia"
Nuclear Ramjet - "Deep Blue" (Remix)
Flash - "The Day After"
Jan Johnston - "Silent Words" (Solarstone Vocal Mix)
Insigma - "Open Your Eyes" (Instrumental)
PPK - "Resurection" (Space Club Mix)

References

Paul Oakenfold remix albums
2001 remix albums